Rucamelen Airport ,  was a rural airstrip  east of Bulnes, a town in the Bío Bío Region of Chile.

Google Earth Historical Imagery (3/9/2015) shows a well marked  grass runway. The (11/13/2015) and subsequent imagery show the runway area divided into three separate fields, plowed, and cropped.

See also

Transport in Chile
List of airports in Chile
Bulnes El Litral Airport

References

External links
OpenStreetMap - Rucamelen

Defunct airports
Airports in Ñuble Region